Prevost's ground sparrow (Melozone biarcuata), also known as the white-faced ground sparrow, is an American sparrow.

Etymology
Its English name commemorates French naturalist Florent Prévost.

Distribution and habitat
This bird breeds at middle altitudes from southern Mexico to western Honduras.  The Cabanis's ground sparrow was previously considered a subspecies. It is found typically at altitudes between 600 and 1600 m in the undergrowth and thickets of semi-open woodland, coffee plantations, hedgerows and large gardens.

Description
Prevost's ground sparrow is on average 15 cm long and weighs 28 g.  The adult has a stubby dark-grey bill, unstreaked olive-brown upperparts, a rufous crown and mainly white underparts.  Young birds are browner above, have yellower underparts, and a duller indistinct head pattern. It has a simple head pattern in which the rufous of the crown extends down the sides of the neck as a half collar behind the white face.

Behaviour
Usually found in pairs, the bird is a shy species best seen at or near dusk. They sometimes venture in the open in the early morning.

Breeding
The nest, built by the female, is a neat lined cup constructed less than 2 m up in a bush or large tussock. The female lays a clutch of two or three ruddy-blotched white eggs, which she incubates for 12–14 days. The male helps in feeding the chicks. This species is sometimes parasitised by the bronzed cowbird.

Feeding
The bird feeds on the ground on seeds, fallen berries, insects and spiders.

Voice
Calls include a thin  or a clearer . The male's song, given from a hidden perch in the wet season,  is a whistled .

References

External links
Photo-High Res; Article
Prevost's ground sparrow photo gallery VIREO
Photos; Article birdguatemala

Prevost's ground sparrow
Birds of Mexico
Birds of Guatemala
Birds of El Salvador
Birds of Honduras
Prevost's ground sparrow
Prevost's ground sparrow